Helen W. Wright (born 1943) was the first female Lord Provost of Dundee when elected in 1999. She  was one of five city Bailies and also became the first Lord Provost in the city to be voted to be removed from office (in an expenses row).

Career 
Wright was the first female leader of a major trades union, and a local councillor for 36 years. She has acted as director of charitable bodies, and was appointed as a Fellow of the Al-Maktoum Institute in 2006. She represented the council on the Dundee Health and Social Care Partnership from 2018.

Lord Provost and beyond 
Labour Councillor Wright served from 1999-2001 as the city of Dundee's first female Lord Provost. She headed a minority administration with a Scottish National Party opposition and Conservatives as the other minority group.  She had her official portrait painted by artist Adam B. Kerr which is held in the Dundee Art Galleries and Museum's collections.

She was voted out of office, the first Lord Provost in the city to be removed in this manner, in a special meeting, reported in June 2021. She claimed to have made an 'honest mistake' in submitting expenses claims for charity donations which she said were made on 'behalf of the city', and had been repaid in full and an apology given.  She continued  to serve as a Labour councillor, and was successfully re-elected to represent the Coldside Ward in 2007, 2012 and 2017.

In 2020, with most UK politicians, Wright was forced, due to the Covid 19 pandemic, to withdraw from personal face to face 'surgery' consulting meetings with her constituents.

Image 

 See official portrait of Lord Provost Helen W. Wright

References 

Women political candidates
People from Dundee
Lord Provosts of Dundee
1943 births
Labour Party (UK) councillors
Living people